Laura Cardoso, artistic name of Laurinda de Jesus Cardoso Balleroni OMC (born 13 September 1927) is a Brazilian actress. She is celebrated as one of the best and most well known Brazilian actresses of cinema, theater and television.

Early life 
Laurinda de Jesus Cardoso was born in São Paulo, the daughter of Portuguese immigrants. At first, the parents resisted. But when she was 15, Laura had no doubt. She decided that it was time to take the tram of history and began the career of actress of radionovelas in Radio Cosmos.

Career 
Still young, Cardoso made her debut in the Tupi TV show Tribunal do Coração (1952). She participated in telenovelas such as Um Lugar ao Sol (1959), an adaptation of Theodore Dreiser's novel by Dionísio Azevedo, and  Ídolo de Pano (1975) by Teixeira Filho. At the same time, Cardoso also worked at TV Excelsior, RecordTV and TV Cultura.

After two years dedicated to the theater, in 1981, she was invited by Globo to integrate the cast of  Gilberto Braga's telenovela Brilhante.

In 1982, she starred in Ninho de Serpente and Renúncia aired by TV Bandeirantes. Back in the Globo TV, Cardoso appeared in three Walther Negrão's telenovelas: Pão-Pão, Beijo-Beijo (1983), Livre para Voar (1984) e Fera Radical (1988). After that, she made Silvio de Abreu's Rainha da Sucata (1990), and Manoel Carlos's Felicidade (1991), and three remakes of very successful telenovelas, two by Ivani Ribeiro, Mulheres de Areia (1993) and A Viagem (1994).

In 1995, Cardoso appeared in Irmãos Coragem and Gloria Perez's Explode Coração, the first telenovela filmed in Projac (today Estúdios Globo). In 1998, Cardoso starred in Vila Madalena, and after a brief passage in RecordTV, where she appeared in Marcos Lazarini's Vidas Cruzadas (2000), she returned to Globo to starred Walcyr Carrasco's A Padroeira in 2001.

She then appeared as Madalena in Esperança (2002), and in 2003 as Carmen in Chocolate com Pimenta.

In 2005, she appeared in the mini-series Hoje É Dia de Maria, Cardoso also participated in the cast of O Profeta (2006), and in Aguinaldo Silva's Duas Caras (2007). In Caminho das Índias (2009) she played the Indian Laksmi Ananda.

In 2010 she played Mariquita in Araguaia. In 2012, she starred in the role of Dorotéia, in the remake of Gabriela, an adaptation of Jorge Amado's novel, written by Walcyr Carrasco.

In 2014, she appeared in three productions of Globo: in the television series Segunda Dama and in the telenovelas Império and Boogie Oogie.

Filmography

1964 - Imitando o Sol
1964 - O Rei Pelé
1965 - Quatro Brasileiros em Paris
1969 - Corisco, O Diabo Loiro
1976 - Já Não Se Faz Amor Como Antigamente
1977 - Tiradentes, O Mártir da Independência
1979 - Gaivotas
1980 - Ariella
1982 - Um Casal de Três .... Shirley
1987 - Quincas Borba
1988 - Adultério (short film)
1988 - Fera Radical
1989 - Lua Cheia
1990 - Rainha da Sucata .... Iolanda Maia
1991 - Felicidade .... Cândida Peixoto
1993 - Mulheres de Areia .... Isaura
1994 - A Viagem .... Dona Guiomar
1995 - Irmãos Coragem .... Sinhana
1995 - Terra Estrangeira .... Manuela
1995 - Explode Coração .... Soraya
1996 - Salsa e Merengue .... Ruth Campos Queiroz
1998 - Uma Aventura de Zico
1998 - Meu Bem Querer .... Yeda Ferreira de Souza
1999 - Vila Madalena .... 	Deolinda Xavier
2000 - Através da janela .... Selma
2001 - Copacabana .... Selma
2001 - A Padroeira .... Silvana
2002 - No Bar
2002 - Morte
2002 - Esperança
2003 - Chocolate com Pimenta
2004 - Como uma Onda
2004 - Sob Nova Direção .... Madre Superiora
2005 - Hoje é dia de Maria .... Narrador
2006 - Belíssima .... Woman (cameo)
2006 - O Profeta .... Abigail
2007 - Desejo Proibido .... Sebastiana (cameo)
2007 - Duas Caras .... Alice (cameo)
2008 - Ciranda de Pedra .... Prosópia (cameo)
2009 - India – A Love Story .... Laksmi Ananda
2010 - Araguaia .... Mariquita
2011 - A Grande Família .... Glória Rosa e Silva
2012 - Gabriela .... Doroteia
2013 - Pé na Cova
2013 - Flor do Caribe
2014 - Império
2016 - Sol Nascente
2017 - O Outro Lado do Paraíso
2019 - A Dona do Pedaço

References

External links

 

1927 births
Living people
Actresses from São Paulo
Brazilian people of Portuguese descent
Brazilian film actresses
Brazilian telenovela actresses
20th-century Brazilian actresses
21st-century Brazilian actresses